Burning Springs is an unincorporated community in Clay County, Kentucky, United States. It is located along U.S. Route 421 by its junction with Kentucky Route 472. It has one school, Burning Springs Elementary. It is about 4 miles from Jackson County but about 7 miles from Manchester, the county seat.

Nearby Burning Spring is a stream around which natural gas escapes from the ground which may be set alight.

References

Unincorporated communities in Clay County, Kentucky
Unincorporated communities in Kentucky